The Crammer is a 1958 West German comedy film directed by Axel von Ambesser and starring Heinz Rühmann, Wera Frydtberg and Gert Fröbe. It was shot at the Bavaria Studios in Munich. The film's sets were designed by the art directors Hans Berthel and Robert Stratil.

Plot
Germany in the mid-1950s: Dr. Seidel (Rühmann) is a successful teacher at a high school in a provincial town. Old fashioned and dutiful as he is, he takes on the challenge to teach a graduating class at a big city high school, when asked by the governmental school inspector. On arrival at his new working place he is hit by a student while trying to settle a quarrel among youngsters in the schoolyard. The beginning looks like an omen: his new class proves to be an unruly gang. While trying establish discipline Dr. Seidel makes himself quite unpopular; he is even faced with mobbing by a former student (Löwitsch), who is now a gang leader with criminal ambitions. However  Dr. Seidel is made of stern stuff and step by step wins the respect first of one student (Kraus), then of all others, thereby ruling out the gang leader, and he learns to respect the students.

In a side story Dr. Seidel courts the older sister (Frydtberg) of a student but is defeated, so he falls back to a co-teacher (Löbel) living next door in the same boardinghouse. On the other side of his boardinghouse is a wrestler (Fröbe) who teaches him wrestling tricks in exchange for teaching "good German" as the wrestler proves to be illiterate.

Cast 
 Heinz Rühmann as Dr. Hermann Seidel
 Wera Frydtberg as Vera Bork
 Gert Fröbe as Freddy Blei
 Bruni Löbel as Frl. Selinski
 Ernst Fritz Fürbringer as School inspector Wagner
 Hans Leibelt as Headmaster Wiesbacher
 Franz-Otto Krüger as Headmaster Gaspari
 Klaus Löwitsch as Harry Engelmann
  as Martin Rössler
 Michael Verhoeven as Peter Wieland
 Peter Vogel as Eduard Neureiter
  as Axel
  as Rudi Bär
 Peter Kraus as Achim Bork

References

Bibliography
 Reimer, Robert C. & Reimer, Carol J. The A to Z of German Cinema. Scarecrow Press, 2010.

External links 

1958 comedy films
West German films
Films about educators
Films set in schools
1958 films
1950s German-language films
Films directed by Axel von Ambesser
Gloria Film films
Films shot at Bavaria Studios
1950s German films